Ramana may refer to:

 Ramana, Pakistan, place in Pakistan
 Ramana, Azerbaijan, place in Azerbaijan
 Chintapalli Ramana, Telugu film writer
 Mullapudi Venkata Ramana, Telugu scriptwriter
 Ramana Maharshi, Hindu spiritual figure
 Ramana Reddy, Telugu film actor
 Ramana (actor), Tamil film actor
 Ramana (director), directed several Tamil language films in the 2000s
 Ramanaa, 2002 Tamil film